Mard Ki Zabaan  is a 1987 Bollywood film starring Dharmendra, Jackie Shroff, Poonam Dhillon and Kimi Katkar. The film was a remake of the Telugu film Yuga Purushudu.

Plot
Ram Chauhan makes a living as a farmer and lives with his brother, Laxman. He falls in love with wealthy Laxmi Sahay, much to the chagrin of her father, Raghupati, who breaks off all relations with her. His anger does not subside even when Laxmi gives birth to a son, Vijay. When Raghupati announces that his sole beneficiary is going to be Shrinath, Laxman opposes this action, is assaulted, and eventually Ram ends up getting killed, Laxmi get separated from Vijay, who ends up being adopted by an other man, who renames him Rajesh. An angered Laxman goes to avenge his brother's death, kills some of Shrinath's goons, is arrested and sentenced to several years in prison. Years later, while still in prison, his friend, Govind, informs him that Raghupati has been conned by Shrinath and his son, Monty, and they have hired an impersonator, who has killed Raghupati and taken over the estate. Laxman escapes from prison and is hellbent on destroying the impersonator, Shrinath and Monty at any and all costs - that is if the police and the impersonator let him.

Cast

 Dharmendra as Laxman Chauhan
 Jackie Shroff as Vijay Chauhan / Rajesh
 Poonam Dhillon as Lata
 Kimi Katkar as Rosy
 Tanuja
 Raj Kiran as Anand
 Navin Nischol as Ram Chauhan
Sushma Seth as Laxmi Sahay
 Shreeram Lagoo as Zamindar Raghupati Sahay
 Vikas Anand as Govind
 Asrani as Rahim / Inspector Totaram
 Prem Chopra as Shrinath
 Shakti Kapoor as Monty
 Deep Dhillon as Goon 
Manik Irani as Red Devil

Soundtrack

External links
 

1987 films
1980s Hindi-language films
Films directed by K. Bapayya
Films scored by Laxmikant–Pyarelal
Hindi remakes of Telugu films